Mouin Rabbani is a Dutch-Palestinian Middle East analyst specializing in the Arab-Israeli conflict and Palestinian affairs. Rabbani is based in Amman, Jordan and was a Senior Analyst for the International Crisis Group, the Palestine Director of the Palestine American Research Center, a Project Director for the Association of Netherlands Municipalities, and a volunteer and General Editor for Al Haq. Rabbani is currently a senior fellow at the Institute for Palestine Studies, a co-editor of Jadaliyya, and a Contributing Editor to the Middle East Report.

Background
Rabbani was born in the Heerenveen, Netherlands. He received his B.A. in History and International Relations from Tufts University in 1986. Additionally, Mouin Rabbani received his M.A. in Contemporary Arab Studies from Georgetown University.

Writing
Rabbani has written for a variety of publications including Third World Quarterly, Journal of Palestine Studies, The Nation, Foreign Policy, London Review of Books, and The Hill. His opinion and analysis has been cited by international news media such as The New York Times, The Guardian,  Reuters,  Haaretz, The Washington Post, and Al Jazeera. Unlike some of his contemporaries, he is scathing of the idea of a one-state solution to Israel–Palestine.

Book
Aborted State? The UN Initiative and New Palestinian Junctures. Co-edited with Noura Erakat, 2013.

Interviews
 "Debate: Does U.N. Statehood Bid Advance or Undermine Palestinian Struggle?" (debate with Ali Abunimah), Democracy Now, 23 September 2011.
"Noam Chomsky: U.S.-Backed Israeli Policies Pursuing "End of Palestine"; Hezbollah Capture of Israeli Soldiers "Very Irresponsible Act" That Could Lead To "Extreme Disaster", Democracy Now, 14  July 2006.

References

External links
Biography  from the Institute for Palestine Studies
 Articles written by Mouin Rabbani as a contributing editor for the Middle East Report
 Articles written by Mouin Rabbani as a co-editor for Jadaliyya

Year of birth missing (living people)
Living people
Palestinian political journalists
Middle Eastern studies scholars
Tufts University alumni
Georgetown University alumni
Dutch people of Palestinian descent